Patricio Romero (born 24 March 1993) is an Argentine footballer who plays for Talleres de Remedios de Escalada on loan from Club Atlético Temperley as a defender.

References

External links

1993 births
Living people
Association football defenders
Argentine footballers
Club Atlético Temperley footballers
Juventud Unida de Gualeguaychú players
Estudiantes de Buenos Aires footballers
Talleres de Remedios de Escalada footballers
Argentine Primera División players
Primera Nacional players
Primera B Metropolitana players